A śmaśāna (Devanagari: श्मशान) is a Hindu crematory ground, where dead bodies are brought to be burnt on a pyre. It is usually located near a river or body of water on the outskirts of a village or town; as they are usually located near river ghats they are also called smashan ghat. 

The word has its origin from Sanskrit language: shma refers to shava ("corpse"), while shana refers to shanya ("bed"). The other Indian religions like Sikhism, Jainism and Buddhism also use śmaśāna for the last rites of the dead.

Hinduism

As per Hindu rites of Nepal and India, the dead body is brought to śmaśāna for Antim Sanskar (last rites). At the cremation ground, the chief mourner has to obtain the sacred fire from the Dom caste, who reside by the śmaśāna and light funeral pyres (chita) for a fee. 

Various Hindu scriptures also give details of how to select the site of śmaśāna: it should be on the northern side of the village with land sloping towards the south, it should be near a river or a source of water and should not be visible from a distance.

Dead bodies are traditionally cremated on a funeral pyre usually made of wood. However, nowadays in many cities of India there are electric or gas based furnaces used in indoor crematoria.

Jainism
The Jains also cremate the dead as soon as possible to avoid growth of micro-organisms. Ghee, camphor and sandalwood powder are sprinkled all over the body and the eldest son of the deceased does the last rituals, who lights up the pyre in Smashana chanting Navkar Mantra. After cremation, they sprinkle milk on that place. They collect the ashes but unlike Hindus, they do not immerse them in the water. Instead of it they dig the ground and bury the ashes in that pit and sprinkle salt in the pit

Early Buddhism
In the Pali Canon discourses, Gautama Buddha frequently instructs his disciples to seek out a secluded dwelling (in a forest, under the shade of a tree, mountain, glen, hillside cave, charnel ground, jungle grove, in the open, or on a heap of straw).
The Vinaya and Sutrayana tradition of the "Nine Cemetery Contemplations" (Pali: nava sīvathikā-manasikāra) described in the Satipatthana Sutta demonstrate that charnel ground and cemetery meditations were part of the ascetic practices in Early Buddhism.

'Cemetery contemplations', as described in Mahasatipatthana Sutta (DN: 22)  and the Satipaṭṭhāna Sutta (MN: 10):

Spiritual role
The śmaśāna is said to be abode of ghosts, evil spirits, fierce deities, tantrics. Therefore, people in general prefer to avoid going near śmaśāna at night. Per Hindu rituals women do not go to śmaśāna, only males go to śmaśāna to perform last rites. Only the Doms and Chandalas reside in or near śmaśāna.

Śmaśāna is a place, where followers of Vamamarga like Aghori, Kapalika, Kashmiri Shaivism, Kaula of now scarce Indian tantric traditions do sadhana (for example Shava sadhana) and rituals to worship Kali, Tara, Bhairav, Bhairavi, Dakini, Vetal, etc. invoke occult powers within them. Śmaśāna is also used for similar purpose by followers of Tibetan Buddhist traditions of Vajrayana, Dzogchen for sadhna of Chöd, Phowa, Zhitro, etc. The deity called Shmashana Adhipati is usually considered to be lord of Śmaśāna.

See also

 Shmashana Adhipati
 Charnel ground

References

Buddhism and death
Burial monuments and structures
Cremation
Death and Hinduism
Indian words and phrases
Pali words and phrases